Clay Deweese (born November 13, 1981) is an American real estate broker and politician serving as a member of the Mississippi House of Representatives from the 12th district.

Early life and education 
Deweese was born in Clarksdale, Mississippi. He graduated from the University of Mississippi School of Business Administration in 2004.

Career 
Deweese works as a real estate broker and lives in Oxford, Mississippi. He is a member of the Mississippi House of Representatives, having represented the state's 12th House district, composed of part of Lafayette County, since 2020.

References 

Living people
1981 births
Republican Party members of the Mississippi House of Representatives
People from Oxford, Mississippi